WHWC (88.3 FM) is a radio station licensed to Menomonie, Wisconsin, United States, serving the Eau Claire area. The station is part of Wisconsin Public Radio (WPR), and airs WPR's "Ideas Network", consisting of news and talk programming.  WHWC also broadcasts regional news and programming from studios in Wisconsin Public Broadcasting's regional center in Eau Claire.

See also Wisconsin Public Radio

External links
Wisconsin Public Radio

University of Wisconsin–Stout
HWC
Wisconsin Public Radio
NPR member stations
Radio stations established in 1950